is a former sumo wrestler from Chiba City, Japan. His highest rank was sekiwake. In 1991 he won a top division yūshō or tournament championship from the maegashira ranks.

Career
Kotofuji made his professional debut in March 1980. He had a long apprenticeship in the junior ranks, not breaking through to the jūryō division until November 1986.  He had an awkward build for sumo, as his long legs meant his hips were high and therefore his centre of gravity was much higher than the ideal. During the short stay of Canadian wrestler Kototenzan at Sadogatake stable, Kotofuji was one of the few wrestlers who attempted to communicate with him in English.

He reached the top makuuchi division in September 1988, scoring 11 wins in his top division debut and receiving a share of the Fighting Spirit prize.  He made his san'yaku debut at sekiwake in July 1990 but held the rank for only one tournament. He earned his first gold star in January 1991 with a win over Ōnokuni.

Kotofuji is best remembered for his extraordinary performance in the Nagoya tournament of July 1991, where he became the first maegashira to win the tournament championship in nearly six years. After a poor 5-10 record at maegashira 7 the previous tournament he was ranked at maegashira 13, and fought only his fellow maegashira for the first nine days. Winning all those bouts, he was paired against ōzeki Kirishima, yokozuna Asahifuji and ōzeki Konishiki on days 10 to 12 - and won all of those matches too. It was the first time he had defeated either Asahifuji or Konishiki. His yūshō was confirmed the following day when he defeated sekiwake Takatōriki to go to 13–0, with no else scoring better than ten. He became the first wrestler ranked below ōzeki to win the championship by Day 13 since the introduction of 15-day tournaments. Although he was beaten by Takahanada on Day 14, he defeated Akebono on the final day to finish with an outstanding 14–1 record, two wins clear of runner-up Konishiki on 12–3. Both yokozuna, Asahifuji and Hokutoumi had poor tournaments, turning in scores of 8-7 and 9–6, the worst ever for a tournament with two yokozuna. Kotofuji received his second Fighting Spirit prize as well as the Emperor's Cup. He was as surprised as anyone else at his win, telling an interviewer for Channel 4 that he had just wanted the tournament to be over as soon as possible as he felt sure he wouldn't make it.

Kotofuji never approached anything like those heights again. He scored only 4-11 at komusubi in the following tournament and never made san'yaku again. After a series of poor results he was demoted to the second jūryō division in 1994 and announced his retirement from sumo in September 1995.

Retirement from sumo
He became an elder of the Japan Sumo Association, under the name of Kumegawa Oyakata, but he had to leave the sumo world in July 1999 when his toshiyori name was needed by his retiring former stablemate Kotoinazuma. Because his career as an oyakata had lasted less than four years, he was not entitled to any retirement money. Kotofuji then launched a new career as a television personality, doing reporting and sportscasting. He was a member of Konishiki's talent agency. He also worked as a manager of one of ex-sekiwake Takatoriki's yakiniku restaurants.

In February 2014 he was arrested for engaging in a fake marriage to a Korean national so she could receive permanent resident status.

Fighting style
Kotofuji was a yotsu-sumo wrestler, preferring a hidari-yotsu, (right hand outside, left hand inside) grip on his opponent's mawashi. His most common winning kimarite was yori-kiri, a straightforward force out, which accounted for half his victories at sekitori level, but he was also fond of using his right hand grip to win by uwatenage, or overarm throw. His height of 192 cm made him amongst the tallest wrestlers but his weight of 145 kg was not much more than most of his competitors.

Career record

See also
Glossary of sumo terms
List of sumo tournament top division champions
List of past sumo wrestlers
List of sekiwake

References

External links
 Kotofuji's tournament results

1964 births
Living people
Japanese sumo wrestlers
Sumo people from Chiba Prefecture
Sekiwake
Sadogatake stable sumo wrestlers